Syed Ali Haider Zaidi is a Pakistani politician who served as the Federal Minister for Maritime Affairs from 11 September 2018 to 10 April 2022. He is the President of Pakistan Tehreek-e-Insaf Sindh chapter. He has been previously also remained a member of the National Assembly of Pakistan from August 2018 to January 2023.

Political career
In 1999, Zaidi joined PTI

He ran for the seat of the Provincial Assembly of Sindh as a candidate of PTI from Constituency PS-116 (Karachi-XXVIII) in the 2002 general elections, but was unsuccessful. He received 2,941 votes and lost the seat to Nasrullah Khan, a candidate of the MMA.

He ran for the seat of the National Assembly of Pakistan as a candidate of PTI from Constituency NA-252 (Karachi-XIV) and from Constituency NA-208 (Jacobabad) in the 2013 general elections but was unsuccessful. He received 49,622 votes from NA-252 (Karachi-XIV) and lost to Abdul Rashid Godil). He received 7,589 votes from NA-208 (Jacobabad) and lost the seat to Aijaz Hussain Jakhrani.

On 25 December 2014, he was appointed as president of PTI's Karachi chapter. In December 2015, he announced that he would resign as president of PTI's Karachi chapter in the aftermath of party's poor performance in local government elections.

He was elected to the National Assembly from the Constituency NA-244 (Karachi East-III) as a candidate of PTI in 2018 general elections.

On 11 September 2018, he was inducted into the federal cabinet of Prime Minister Imran Khan and was appointed as Federal Minister for Maritime Affairs.

Ali Zaidi was appointed as PTI's Sindh Chapter president by Imran Khan on 25th Dec 2021.

Controversy
In July 2017, Saleem Safi accused Zaidi of working against Saudi Arabia and in favor of Iranian lobby groups. Zaidi rejected the allegations and sent a legal notice to Saleem claiming  in damages.

External Link

More Reading
 List of members of the 15th National Assembly of Pakistan

References

Living people
Pakistani MNAs 2018–2023
Pakistan Tehreek-e-Insaf MNAs
Year of birth missing (living people)